Yazdani derived from the ancient Persian word Yazdan, meaning deity and gods. People with this surname are mainly from the city of Yazd, Yazd province, central Iran. However, this surname can be found amongst the people from other parts of Iran such as Kerman, Tabriz, Shiraz, and Taleghan.

Notable people with the surname include:

 Bobby Yazdani (born 1963), Iranian-American entrepreneur and investor 
 Dariush Yazdani (born 1977), Iranian footballer 
 Golam Yazdani (1917–2009), Bengali politician in India 
 Ghulam Yazdani (1885–1962), Bengali historian and archaeologist in India 
 Haji Kazim Yazdani, Afghani historical researcher
 Hassan Yazdani (born 1994), Iranian wrestler 
 Kausar Yazdani (1935–2011), Indian Islamic scholar 
 Raushan Yazdani (1918-1967), Bengali poet and researcher 
 Rawshan Yazdani Bhuiyan (died 1981), Bangladeshi freedom fighter 
 Reza Yazdani (born 1984), Iranian wrestler 
 Reza Yazdani (singer) (born 1973), Iranian singer 
 Sattar Yazdani (born 1949), Iranian singer 
 Siavash Yazdani (born 1992), Iranian association footballer
 Keavan Yazdani (born 1993), Iranian-Filipino Canadian visual
artist.

References

Iranian-language surnames
Persian-language surnames